Lepidozikania is a genus of moths in the family Erebidae. The genus was described by Travassos in 1949.

Species
Lepidozikania cinerascens
Lepidozikania similis

References

External links

Phaegopterina
Moth genera